The John Willden House, at 495 N. 200 West in Beaver, Utah, is a historic stone house built in 1875.  It was listed on the National Register of Historic Places in 1982.

It is a one-story hall and parlor plan black rock cottage built by Thomas Frazer for John Willden.  It has a Greek Revival-style cornice.  It has brown granite lintels above its front facade's door and four windows.

References

Houses on the National Register of Historic Places in Utah
Houses completed in 1875
Beaver County, Utah